Folakunle Oshun (born 1984 in Ibadan) is a Nigerian contemporary visual artist, sculptor and curator. He is the founder and director of Lagos Biennal, an organisation that provides an avenue for dialogue and development of contemporary African arts. Oshun works has been featured in many local and international exhibitions.

Early life and education 
Folakunle Oshun was born and brought up in Ibadan Oyo State, Nigeria. He attended the University of Lagos, where he studied B.A. in Fine Arts (2004 -2007) and M.A. in Art History (2008-2012).

Exhibitions 
Selected curatorial:

 Afrique 2020 season in France 2021
 Look at This Pinakothek der Moderne, Munich 2021.
 Museum of Hope,  Berliner Dom 2021
 'How to Build a Lagoon With Just A Bottle of Wine?''' Lagos Biennial, Lagos (Nigeria) 2019.
 Living on the Edge, Lagos Biennial, Lagos 2017.
 Dak’art 2016''

See also 

 Lemi Ghariokwu
 Ade Adekola
 Nengi Omuku

References 

1984 births
Living people
21st-century Nigerian artists
21st-century Nigerian painters
Nigerian printmakers
Yoruba artists
People from Ibadan
Nigerian sculptors